The 2000–01 season was the 58th season in the existence of Nantes Atlantique and the club's 39th consecutive season in the top flight of French football. They participated in the Ligue 1, the Coupe de France and Coupe de la Ligue.

Nantes Atlantique was crowned champions of Division 1 for the eighth time in its history.

Competitions

Overview

Division 1

League table

Results summary

Results by round

Matches

Coupe de France

Coupe de la Ligue

Trophée des Champions

UEFA Cup

First round

Second round

Third round

Fourth round

Statistics

Goalscorers

References

FC Nantes seasons
FC Nantes
French football championship-winning seasons